"Como tú no hay dos" (English: "Like You There Ain't Two") is a song by Mexican singer-songwriter Thalía featuring American singer and rapper Becky G, from the former's twelfth studio album Amore Mío (2014). 
The song, written by A. Matheus, Andy Clay,  Rassel Marcano and Gomez, and produced by Armando Avila, was released by Sony Music Latin as the second single from the album in the United States on January 20, 2015.

Background and release 
The song was released on January 20, 2015. The track features Spanglish vocals by both singers, with Thalía leaning more towards Spanish compared to Gomez's Spanish-sprinkled English verses. The fact that the song was in Spanglish was received as a surprise since Thalía rarely sings in English.

Live performance 
Thalía and Becky G performed the song at the Premio Lo Nuestro 2015 where both singers shine while showing off their Latin diva weapons. The performance drew attention because of two incidents: one after Becky G turned her head away as Thalía was going to kiss her forehead and another when Thalía messed up the choreography and accidentally placed her hand on Becky's private area.

Music  video
The music video was released on March 19, 2015, on Thalía's official YouTube channel and, like the performance at Premios Lo Nuestro, it shows both singers shining while showing off their Latin diva weapons. One day after its release, the video reached number one on the digital downloaded videos chart in the U.S. and Mexico.
The video shows Thalía and Becky singing and dancing in a rave-like setting.

Charts

References 

Thalía songs
2015 songs
2015 singles
Sony Music Latin singles
Spanish-language songs
Becky G songs